Tarbagatay is an urban-type settlement in Petrovsk-Zabaykalsky District of Zabaykalsky Krai, Russia. Population:

References 

Urban-type settlements in Zabaykalsky Krai